The Sinagoga de la Congregación Israelita Argentina, also called Templo Libertad, is a Reform synagogue situated in Buenos Aires, Argentina. Situated on Libertad street, near the famous Teatro Colón, the synagogue is home to the Congregación Israelita de la República Argentina and houses a Jewish history museum. It is the oldest congregation in Argentina.

History
The cornerstone was laid in 1897. The construction of the building took 35 years, and it was inaugurated in 1932. The project was led by the engineers Alejandro Enquin and Eugenio Gantner. The building's style has influences from German synagogues of the mid-19th century. It has capacity for 700 people.

See also
History of the Jews in Argentina

References

Reform Judaism in South America
Synagogues in Argentina
Religious buildings and structures in Buenos Aires
Jews and Judaism in Buenos Aires
Synagogues completed in 1932
Reform synagogues